In multivariable calculus, an iterated limit is a limit of a sequence or a limit of a function in the form

 ,

 ,

or other similar forms.

An iterated limit is only defined for an expression whose value depends on at least two variables. To evaluate such a limit, one takes the limiting process as one of the two variables approaches some number, getting an expression whose value depends only on the other variable, and then one takes the limit as the other variable approaches some number.

Types of iterated limits

This section introduces definitions of iterated limits in two variables. These may generalize easily to multiple variables.

Iterated limit of sequence

For each , let  be a real double sequence. Then there are two forms of iterated limits, namely

 .

For example, let

.

Then

 , and

 .

Iterated limit of function

Let . Then there are also two forms of iterated limits, namely

 .

For example, let  such that

.

Then

 , and

 .

The limit(s) for x and/or y can also be taken at infinity, i.e.,

 .

Iterated limit of sequence of functions

For each , let  be a sequence of functions. Then there are two forms of iterated limits, namely

 .

For example, let  such that 

.

Then

 , and

 .

The limit in x can also be taken at infinity, i.e.,

 .

Note that the limit in n is taken discretely, while the limit in x is taken continuously.

Comparison with other limits in multiple variables

This section introduces various definitions of limits in two variables. These may generalize easily to multiple variables.

Limit of sequence

For a double sequence , there is another definition of limit, which is commonly referred to as double limit, denote by
,
which means that for all , there exist  such that  implies .

The following theorem states the relationship between double limit and iterated limits.

Theorem 1. If  exists and equals L,  exists for each large m, and  exists for each large n, then  and  also exist, and they equal L, i.e.,
.

For example, let
.

.

This condition cannot be dropped. For example, consider

.

Then we may see that

,
but  does not exist.

This is because  does not exist in the first place.

Limit of function

For a two-variable function , there are two other types of limits. One is the ordinary limit, denoted by

,

which means that for all , there exist  such that  implies .

For this limit to exist, f(x, y) can be made as close to L as desired along every possible path approaching the point (a, b). In this definition, the point (a, b) is excluded from the paths. Therefore, the value of f at the point (a, b), even if it is defined, does not affect the limit.

The other type is the double limit, denoted by
,
which means that for all , there exist  such that  and  implies .

For this limit to exist, f(x, y) can be made as close to L as desired along every possible path approaching the point (a, b), except the lines x=a and y=b. In other words, the value of f along the lines x=a and y=b does not affect the limit. This is different from the ordinary limit where only the point (a, b) is excluded. In this sense, ordinary limit is a stronger notion than double limit:
Theorem 2. If  exists and equals L, then exists and equals L, i.e.,

.

Both of these limits do not involve first taking one limit and then another. This contrasts with iterated limits where the limiting process is taken in x-direction first, and then in y-direction (or in reversed order).

The following theorem states the relationship between double limit and iterated limits:

Theorem 3. If  exists and equals L,  exists for each y near b, and  exists for each x near a, then  and  also exist, and they equal L, i.e.,
.

For example, let

.

.
(Note that in this example,  does not exist.)

This condition cannot be dropped. For example, consider

.

Then we may see that

,
but  does not exist.

This is because  does not exist for x near 0 in the first place.

Combining Theorem 2 and 3, we have the following corollary:

Corollary 3.1. If  exists and equals L,  exists for each y near b, and  exists for each x near a, then  and  also exist, and they equal L, i.e.,
.

Limit at infinity of function

For a two-variable function , we may also define the double limit at infinity
,
which means that for all , there exist  such that  and  implies .

Similar definitions may be given for limits at negative infinity.

The following theorem states the relationship between double limit at infinity and iterated limits at infinity:

Theorem 4. If  exists and equals L,  exists for each large y, and  exists for each large x, then  and  also exist, and they equal L, i.e.,
.

For example, let
.

.

This condition cannot be dropped. For example, consider

.

Then we may see that

,
but  does not exist.

This is because  does not exist for fixed y in the first place.

Invalid converses of the theorems

The converses of Theorems 1, 3 and 4 do not hold, i.e., the existence of iterated limits, even if they are equal, does not imply the existence of the double limit. A counter-example is

near the point (0, 0). On one hand,

 .

On the other hand, the double limit  does not exist. This can be seen by taking the limit along the path (x, y) = (t, t) → (0,0), which gives

 ,

and along the path  (x, y) = (t, t2) → (0,0), which gives

 .

Moore-Osgood theorem for interchanging limits

In the examples above, we may see that interchanging limits may or may not give the same result. A sufficient condition for interchanging limits is given by the Moore-Osgood theorem. The essence of the interchangeability depends on uniform convergence.

Interchanging limits of sequences

The following theorem allows us to interchange two limits of sequences.

Theorem 5.

.

Proof. By the uniform convergence, for any  there exist  such that for all ,  implies .

As , we have , which means that  is a Cauchy sequence which converges to a limit .

On the other hand, if we take  first, we have .

Then for that fixed ,  implies .

This proves that . 

Also, by taking , we see that this limit also equals .

A corollary is about the interchangeability of infinite sum.

Corollary 5.1. If  converges uniformly (in m), and  converges for each large n, then  .

Proof.

Interchanging limits of functions

Similar results hold for multivariable functions.

Theorem 6.

.

The a and b here can possibly be infinity.

Proof. By the existence uniform limit, for any  there exist  such that for all ,  and  implies .

As , we have . By Cauchy criterion,  exists and equals a number .

On the other hand, if we take  first, we have .

By the existence of pointwise limit, for any  and  near , there exist  such that  implies .

Then for that fixed ,  implies .

This proves that . 

Also, by taking , we see that this limit also equals .

A counter-example is  near (0,0).

Interchanging limits of sequences of functions

An important variation of Moore-Osgood theorem is specifically for sequences of functions.

Theorem 7.

.

The a here can possibly be infinity.

Proof. By the uniform convergence, for any  there exist  such that for all ,  implies .

As , we have , which means that  is a Cauchy sequence which converges to a limit .

On the other hand, if we take  first, we have .

Then for that fixed ,  implies .

This proves that .

A corollary is the continuity theorem for uniform convergence as follows:

Corollary 7.1.

In other words, the uniform limit of continuous functions is continuous.

Proof. By Theorem 7, .

Another corollary is about the interchangeability of limit and infinite sum.

Corollary 7.2.

 Proof. Direct application of Theorem 7 on  near .

Applications

Sum of infinite entries in a matrix

Consider a matrix of infinite entries
.

Suppose we would like to find the sum of all entries. If we sum it column by column first, we will find that the first column gives 1, while all others give 0. Hence the sum of all columns is 1. However, if we sum it row by row first, it will find that all rows give 0. Hence the sum of all rows is 0.

The explanation for this paradox is that the vertical sum to infinity and horizontal sum to infinity are two limiting processes that cannot be interchanged. Let  be the sum of entries up to entries (n, m). Then we have , but . In this case, the double limit  does not exist, and thus this problem is not well-defined.

Integration over unbounded interval

.

However, such a property may fail for an improper integral over an unbounded interval . In this case, one may rely on the Moore-Osgood theorem.

Consider  as an example.

(Here x=0 is a limiting case.)

Then by the integration theorem for uniform convergence, .

To further interchange the limit  with the infinite summation , the Moore-Osgood theorem requires the infinite series to be uniformly convergent. 

Note that .

Then by the Moore-Osgood theorem, . (Here is the Riemann zeta function.)

See also
 Limit of a sequence
 Limit of a function
 Uniform convergence
 Interchange of limiting operations

Notes

Limits (mathematics)